The Konrad Wolf Prize is a German performing arts, new media art and film award given since 1986 by the Academy of Arts, Berlin (formerly the East German Academy of Arts). It is named after the East German film director and former president of the Academy, Konrad Wolf. The prize is awarded annually, alternating between the Academy's Performing Arts Section and its Film and Media Art Section, and comes with a 5,000 Euros purse.

Recipients
 1986: Walter Heynowski, Gerhard Scheumann
 1987: Rainer Simon
 1988: Ruth Berghaus
 1988: Helke Misselwitz
 1990: Heiner Carow, Wolfram Witt
 1991: Katharina Thalbach
 1992: Peter Konwitschny
 1993: Margarethe von Trotta
 1994: Jürgen Flimm
 1995: Ken Loach
 1996: Christoph Marthaler
 1997: Volker Schlöndorff
 1998: Michael Haneke
 1999: Ula Stöckl
 2000: Klaus Michael Grüber
 2001: Agnès Varda
 2002: Jossi Wieler
 2003: Abbas Kiarostami
 2004: Lars von Trier
 2005: Andres Veiel
 2006: Wolfgang Engel
 2007: Edgar Reitz
 2008: Simon McBurney
 2009: Avi Mograbi
 2010: Alvis Hermanis
 2011: Béla Tarr
 2012: Meg Stuart
 2013: Ostkreuz
 2014: Jürgen Holtz
 2015: Christoph Schlingensief (postum)

References 

German film awards
Awards established in 1986